Samah Mar'ab or Sameh Mareev (born January 8, 1991) is an Arab-Israeli footballer.

References

External links
 
 
 

1991 births
Living people
Israeli footballers
Maccabi Petah Tikva F.C. players
F.C. Kafr Qasim players
Maccabi Netanya F.C. players
Hapoel Umm al-Fahm F.C. players
Israeli Premier League players
Footballers from Kafr Qasim
Association football midfielders
Arab-Israeli footballers
Arab citizens of Israel
Israeli Muslims